Bandraboua is a commune in the French overseas department of Mayotte, in the Indian Ocean.

Geography 
The municipality of Boundraboua is located at the northern end of the main island of Mayottes. In addition to the main village of Bandraboua, the villages of Handrema, Mtsangamboua, Dzoumogné and Bouyouni make up the municipality.

Sugar and rum factory in Dzoumogné 

It had a presumably manually operated Decauville railway. This indicates that it may have been laid by the Société J. F. Cail & Cie as early as 1880, when the factory building was constructed, to transport its steel girders and the steam boilers which had been imported from France. It was later used to ship the sugar and rum to the harbour. Production ceased in 1955.

Population

Personalities 
 Warmed Omari (born 23 April 2000), a professional footballer who plays as a defender for Ligue 1 club Rennes.

References

Populated places in Mayotte
Communes of Mayotte
Decauville